The Dr. Neil Crow Sr. House is a historic house at 19 Berry Hill Road in Fort Smith, Arkansas.  Completed in 1968, it is a good local example of residential Mid-Century Modern architecture.  It was designed by John Williams, one of the founders of the University of Arkansas's school of architecture.  The house has signature elements of the style, including deep overhanging eaves, unusual window placements, and the use of a variety of materials on the exterior.

The house was listed on the National Register of Historic Places in 1979.

See also
National Register of Historic Places listings in Sebastian County, Arkansas

References

Houses on the National Register of Historic Places in Arkansas
Houses completed in 1968
Houses in Fort Smith, Arkansas
National Register of Historic Places in Sebastian County, Arkansas